Adelmo Prenna (born 27 May 1930 – 14 December 2008) was an Italian professional football player and coach.

He played for 6 seasons (128 games, 37 goals) in the Serie A for A.S. Roma, SPAL 1907 and Calcio Catania.

He holds the records for most league goals and most goals scored in one season in Serie A for Calcio Catania.

1930 births
2008 deaths
Italian footballers
Serie A players
Serie B players
Serie C players
Serie D players
A.S. Roma players
S.P.A.L. players
Catania S.S.D. players
S.S.C. Napoli players
Italian football managers
Catania S.S.D. managers
Association football midfielders
Footballers from Rome